Berlin-Hohenschönhausen is a railway station in the Lichtenberg district of Berlin. The station is located on the Berlin outer ring railway.

Overview

The station is located in the center of the Neu-Hohenschönhausen district, at the intersection of the Berlin outer ring with Falkenberger Chaussee. The road crosses the track with three overpasses, of which the northern and southern serves individual traffic. The middle flyover is used by buses and trams.

The S-Bahn station is located on the VzG route 6012, which runs from Berlin Springpfuhl to Berlin-Wartenberg, the S-Bahn station Wartenberg itself is a station part of the S-Bahn station Hohenschönhausen. The station has two continuous main tracks, which are connected via a Weichentrapez between Hohenschönhausen and Wartenberg. The station has a total of five main signals, one entry and exit signal and three intermediate signals. The Hl signals are operated by the electromechanical interlocking Hsh (type E 12/78) at the northern end of the S-Bahn platform. The relay block is used as a route block in the direction of Springpfuhl. The S-Bahn station is equipped with a 103 centimeters high and 163 meters long central platform, there are access to both sides of the Falkenberger Chaussee and the tram and bus stop in the middle. The northern access has a ramp.

The Berlin-Hohenschönhausen branch is composed of the breakpoint on the VzG line 6067 (Abzw Biesdorfer cross north - Abzw Karow east) and a branch off to the south. At the branching point threads the running parallel to the outer ring VzG line 6160 (Berlin-Hohenschönhausen - Abzw Biesdorfer Cross North), at which the station is Berlin Northeast. The block signals of the branch point are remote from the relay interlock Bik (type GS II Sp64b) at Biesdorfer cross off, the track is equipped in the area Hohenschönhausen with automatic block AB70. The regional station is equipped with two side platforms, both are each 76 inches high and about 211 meters long. The southern access is via stairs, the northern via two elevator systems. The western platform in direction of travel Berlin-Lichtenberg also has a ground-level access to Wartenberger Straße.

History
To connect the built in the mid-1980s development area Hohenschönhausen II, the present district Neu- Hohenschönhausen, the German Reichsbahn took on 20 December 1984, the first section of the S-Bahn from Springpfuhl to Hohenschönhausen in operation. The operation was initially only a single track. The day after a year was followed by the extension to Wartenberg and the start of the two-track operation. The Hsh interlocking also went into operation with the extension. The regional train platforms were in operation from April 14, 1986. They should later be replaced by a long-distance and S-Bahn stop in Malchow on the federal highway 2. The Westbahnsteig for trips to Berlin-Lichtenberg therefore only received ground-level access to Wartenberger Straße, while the Ostbahnsteig was connected to the Falkenberger Chaussee. Since the housing program of the GDR after the political change were abandoned, the implementation of the project was omitted. In 1998, the regional train station was completely renovated and renewed; the Westbahnsteig got access to the Falkenberger Chaussee, on the north side two elevator systems for barrier-free access went into operation.

Train services
The station is served by the following service(s):

Local services  Templin – Löwenberg – Oranienburg – Berlin
Local services  Eberswalde – Berlin – BER Airport - Terminal 5
Berlin S-Bahn services  Ostbahnhof – Lichtenberg – Wartenberg

Public transport
The station is served by tram lines M4 and M17 and bus services X54, 154, 197, 256, 893 and N56

See also
Hohenschönhausen
Neu-Hohenschönhausen
Alt-Hohenschönhausen

References

Hohenschonhausen
Hoheonschonhausen
Hoheonschonhausen
Railway stations in Germany opened in 1984
1984 establishments in East Germany